Gharib is a crater near the north pole of Saturn's moon Enceladus.  Gharib was first seen in Voyager 2 images.  It is located at 81.1° North Latitude, 241.2° West Longitude and is 26 kilometers across.  A large, dome-like structure occupies the interior of the crater, suggesting the crater has undergone significant viscous relaxation.

Gharib is named after a hero from Arabian Nights.

References

External links
Sindbad (Se-1) at  PIA12783: The Enceladus Atlas

Impact craters on Enceladus